Startime is an Australian television series which aired 1962 to 1963. A Sydney-produced variety series with emphasis on music, it was hosted by John Laws and produced by ATN-7, with the series shown interstate (such as on HSV-7 in Melbourne). In Sydney it aired each Saturday at 7:30PM. It was produced by American Gil Rodin, and was seen as a follow-up to the Revue '62 series.

Despite having aired in an era where music shows were often wiped, a large number of episodes of the series are held by the National Film and Sound Archive.

References

External links
Startime on IMDb

1962 Australian television series debuts
1963 Australian television series endings
Black-and-white Australian television shows
English-language television shows
Australian variety television shows
Seven Network original programming